The Plot Thickens is the third studio album by United Kingdom acid jazz group Galliano. It was released in the UK on Gilles Peterson's Talkin' Loud record label on 27 May 1994. It was placed at number 44 in NME'''s list of the Top 50 Albums of 1994.

Critical receptionTrouser Press wrote that the album "more skillfully integrates the rich multi-cultural vibe into an original, complete style." The Chicago Tribune wrote that "listening to [The Plot Thickens''] is truly an uplifting experience, with Rob Gallagher's rapping and Valerie Etienne's soulful vocals nicely complementing each other."

Track listing

Release history

References

1994 albums
Galliano (band) albums
Talkin' Loud albums
Albums produced by Adam Moseley